The Chaldean Catholic Eparchy of Beirut is the sole eparchy (Eastern Catholic diocese) of the Chaldean Catholic Church (sui iuris, Syro-Oriental Rite in Syriac/Aramaic language) for all Lebanon.

It is immediately dependent on the Chaldean Catholic Patriarch of Babylon (in Baghdad, Iraq), not part of any ecclesiastical province.

Its cathedral episcopal see is in Beirut, the capital of Lebanon.

History 
Established on 3 July 1957, on territory split off from the suppressed Eparchy of Gazireh of the Chaldeans.

Episcopal ordinaries
(all Chaldean Rite)
Suffragan Eparchs (Bishops) of Beirut
 Gabriel Naamo (1957.06.28 – death 1964.02.12), previously Titular Bishop of Batnæ (Latin) (1938.09.30 – 1957.06.28) & Apostolic Administrator of Syria of the Chaldeans (Syria) (1938.09.30 – 1957.06.27) & Apostolic Administrator of Gazireh of the Chaldeans (Turkey) (1938.09.30 – 1957.06.27)
 Gabriel Ganni (1964.02.12 – 1966.03.02), succeeding as former Titular Bishop of Gargara (1956.03.19 – 1964.02.12) & Coadjutor Bishop of Beirut of the Chaldeans (1959 – 1964.02.12), previously Auxiliary Bishop of Beirut of the Chaldeans (1956.03.19 – 1959); later Titular Archbishop of Pessinus (1966.03.02 – 1971.01.15) & Coadjutor Archeparch of Bassorah of the Chaldeans (Iraq) (1966.03.02 – death 1971.01.15), succeeding as Archeparch of Bassorah of the Chaldeans (1971.01.15 – 1981.11.10)
 Raphael J. Bidawid (1966.03.02 – 1989.05.21), previously Eparch of Amadiyah of the Chaldeans (Iraq) (1957.01.20 – 1966.03.02); later Patriarch of Babylon of the Chaldeans (Iraq) ([1989.05.21] 1989.06.11 – death 2003.07.07), President of Synod of the Chaldean Church (1989.06.11 – 2003.07.07), President of Assembly of the Catholic Bishops of Iraq (1989.06.11 – 2003.07.07)
 Michel Kassarji (2001.01.12 – ...)

See also 
Catholic Church in Lebanon
Chaldean Catholic Church

References

External links 
 GCatholic, with incumbent biography links

Chaldean Catholic dioceses
Christian organizations established in 1957